The 1955–56 Polska Liga Hokejowa season was the 21st season of the Polska Liga Hokejowa, the top level of ice hockey in Poland. Eight teams participated in the league, and Legia Warszawa won the championship.

Regular season

The league's top scorer was Hilary Skarżyński of Gornik Katowice with 28 goals.

External links
 Season on hockeyarchives.info

Polska
Polska Hokej Liga seasons
1955–56 in Polish ice hockey